Pločica (Serbian Cyrillic: Плочица) is a village in Serbia. It is situated in the Kovin municipality, in the South Banat District, Vojvodina province. The village has a Serb ethnic majority (94.32%) and a population of 2,044 (2002 census).

Name
In Serbian the village is known as Pločica (Плочица), in Hungarian as Kevepallós, in German as Ploschitz or Blauschütz, and in Romanian as Plocița.

History
The area was originally settled by Serbs in the end of the 17th century and later by the German colonists in the end of the 18th century. In 1910, village had Serb majority and sizable Danube Swabian minority. Until the Second World War, 1,300 Danube Swabians lived in Pločica.

Historical population
1948: 2,364
1953: 2,702
1961: 2,371
1971: 2,146
1981: 2,100
1991: 2,013

Ethnic groups

References

Slobodan Ćurčić, Broj stanovnika Vojvodine, Novi Sad, 1996.

See also
List of places in Serbia
List of cities, towns and villages in Vojvodina

Populated places in Serbian Banat
Populated places in South Banat District
Kovin